Chen Pu (born 15 January 1997) is a Chinese professional footballer currently playing as a left winger for Chinese Super League club Shandong Taishan.

Club career
Chen Pu would play for the Shandong Luneng youth team (now renamed Shandong Taishan F.C.) and was sent on loan to Brazilian football club Desportivo Brasil to continue his football development. At Desportivo Brasil he would make his senior debut in a Copa Paulista game on 25 August 2018 against Red Bull Brasil in a match that ended in a 2-2 draw. When he returned back to China with Shandong he was promoted to their senior team and he would make his debut for the club on 10 August 2019 in a league game against Hebei China Fortune F.C. in a 3-0 victory. 

Chen was loaned out to fellow Chinese Super League clubs Shijiazhuang Ever Bright and Henan Songshan Longmen for the 2020 and 2021 season respectively. He returned to Shandong's first team for the 2022 season, scoring his first goal for the club on 6 July 2022, a 87-minute late winner in a 2-1 win against Changchun Yatai. On 15 January 2023, Chen scored the equalizer against Zhejiang Pro in the 2022 Chinese FA Cup final, and Shandong came from behind to win the game 2-1. It was the first major trophy in Chen's career and Shandong achieved an unprecedented 3 successive titles in this competition.

Career statistics
.

Honours

Club

Shandong Taishan
Chinese FA Cup: 2022.

References

External links

1997 births
Living people
Chinese footballers
China youth international footballers
Chinese expatriate footballers
Association football midfielders
Shandong Taishan F.C. players
Cangzhou Mighty Lions F.C. players
Chinese Super League players
Chinese expatriate sportspeople in Brazil
Expatriate footballers in Brazil